Acrotaeniostola extorris is a species of tephritid or fruit flies in the genus Acrotaeniostola of the family Tephritidae.

Distribution
Indonesia.

References

Tephritinae
Insects described in 1942
Diptera of Asia